Tallrikarna is a Swedish island belonging to the Haparanda archipelago. It is located south of the FInnish island Kraaseli. It has no shore connection. There are some buildings on the island.

References 

Islands of Sweden